The 1968 Kentucky Wildcats football team represented the University of Kentucky in the Southeastern Conference during the 1968 NCAA University Division football season.

Schedule

Roster

References

Kentucky
Kentucky Wildcats football seasons
Kentucky Wildcats football